Joseph David Major (July 7, 1893 – September 23, 1942) was a Canadian professional ice hockey player. He played with the Montreal Canadiens of the National Hockey Association.

Major also played with the Montreal Stars of the Montreal Hockey League (MHL) and during the 1914–15 season the team held the Art Ross Trophy, an amateur prize for teams not eligible to compete for the Allan Cup.

References

1893 births
1942 deaths
Anglophone Quebec people
Canadian ice hockey defencemen
Canadian ice hockey goaltenders
Ice hockey people from Quebec
Montreal Canadiens (NHA) players
People from Outaouais